Volker Neumüller (born 18 October 1969) is a German music manager and was known for being a judge on Deutschland sucht den Superstar.

Career 
Born in Cuxhaven, Neumüller has been involved in the music industry since 1987. In 1991, he became the A&R director of Record label PolyGram, a position he also later held at Sony BMG. Between 2002 and 2004, Neumüller was also the general manager of Epic Records.

Neumüller established "313 Music" in 2005, a record label, management and television production company, together with the likes of Mark Medlock, Melanie C, Alex Christensen, Daniele Negroni, Luca Hänni Kate Hall and Daniel Schuhmacher.  He is also the music manager of the band "The Black Pony".

Deutschland sucht den Superstar 
Since the fourth season of DSDS, Neumüller has taken over the management of the series winners. He was a judge for seasons six and seven alongside Dieter Bohlen and Nina Eichinger.

References

External links 
 
 Interview with HitQuarters, 5 March 2001

1969 births
Living people
People from Cuxhaven
German music managers